Gorji may refer to:
 Gorji, Yazd
 Gorji, Kermanshah
 Gorji, Kurdistan
 Gorji, Lorestan
 Gorji-ye Olya, Razavi Khorasan Province
 Gorji-ye Sofla, Razavi Khorasan Province
 Gorji, Zaveh, Razavi Khorasan Province
 Gorji, Semnan
 Gorji Rural District, in Isfahan Province
 Gorjiduz, leather craftsmen who created Georgian-style shoes in 19th century Qajar Iran